Ancylosis arenosella is a species of snout moth in the genus Ancylosis. It was described by Otto Staudinger, in 1859, and is known from Spain, Portugal and Corsica.

The wingspan is about 21 mm.

References

Moths described in 1859
arenosella
Moths of Europe